Greencastle is an unincorporated community in Fairfield County, in the U.S. state of Ohio.

History
Greencastle was laid out in 1810. A post office called Greencastle was established in 1845, and remained in operation until 1902.

Notable person
George Washington Glick, 9th Governor of Kansas

References

Unincorporated communities in Fairfield County, Ohio
Unincorporated communities in Ohio